SS Pioneer was a steam dredging ship which was in service with the Department of Ports & Harbours, Melbourne, Australia, from 1905 to 1975.

References

External links
 

1905 ships
Ships built on the River Clyde
Dredgers
Service vessels of Australia
Maritime incidents in 1950
Scuttled vessels of Australia
Shipwrecks of Victoria (Australia)
Underwater diving sites in Australia